Asphalt Overdrive is a 2014 endless running racing video game published by Gameloft and developed by their Madrid studio. The eleventh major game of Asphalt series. After a showcase in June 2014 at the E3 event, it was released in September 24, 2014 for iOS, Android and Windows Phone, Windows 8.1. The game is officially retired and no longer supported.

Overdrive marks a departure from previous games in the series, as it is an on-rails endless platformer in the vein of Temple Run and Subway Surfers, and takes place in a 1980s-style rendition of Southern California.

Gameplay
As stated earlier, Asphalt Overdrive is presented as an endless runner, and does not offer a traditional racing mode. Like in previous games, cars accelerate automatically, but are limited to a fixed, endless path with three lanes. Performing stunts and ramming civilian vehicles builds up the nitrous meter, to which the player can use in evading police vehicles.

Reception

The iOS version received "mixed" reviews according to the review aggregation website Metacritic.

Notes

References

External links
 

IOS games
Android (operating system) games
Asphalt (series)
Gameloft games
2014 video games
Video game spin-offs
3D platform games
Video games developed in Spain
Video games set in California
Windows Phone games
Universal Windows Platform apps
Windows games
Multiplayer and single-player video games
Endless runner games
Products and services discontinued in 2016
Discontinued iOS software
Delisted digital-only games